In enzymology, a 4-methyleneglutamate—ammonia ligase is an enzyme that catalyzes the chemical reaction

ATP + 4-methylene-L-glutamate + NH3  AMP + diphosphate + 4-methylene-L-glutamine

The 3 substrates of this enzyme are ATP, 4-methylene-L-glutamate, and NH3, whereas its 3 products are AMP, diphosphate, and 4-methylene-L-glutamine.

This enzyme belongs to the family of ligases, specifically those forming carbon-nitrogen bonds as acid-D-ammonia (or amine) ligases (amide synthases).  The systematic name of this enzyme class is 4-methylene-L-glutamate:ammonia ligase (AMP-forming). This enzyme is also called 4-methyleneglutamine synthetase.  This enzyme participates in c5-branched dibasic acid metabolism.

References

 

EC 6.3.1
Enzymes of unknown structure